Lee McKenzie may refer to

 Lee McKenzie (born 1977), Scottish female sports broadcaster

See also
 McKenzie (surname)
 McKenzie (disambiguation)